JPET may refer to:

 Journal of Pharmacology and Experimental Therapeutics
 Journal of Public Economic Theory
 Jagiellonian-PET TOMOGRAPHY